Larry Gould may refer to:

 Laurence McKinley Gould (1896–1995), American scientist & educator 
 Larry Gould (bridge), American bridge player
 Larry Gould (ice hockey) (born 1952), Canadian ice hockey player